Joaquín Ruiz (born 12 January 1959) is a Spanish judoka. He competed at the 1984, 1988 and the 1992 Summer Olympics.

References

External links
 

1959 births
Living people
Spanish male judoka
Olympic judoka of Spain
Judoka at the 1984 Summer Olympics
Judoka at the 1988 Summer Olympics
Judoka at the 1992 Summer Olympics
Sportspeople from Madrid
20th-century Spanish people
21st-century Spanish people